Carl-Gunnar Sundin (born 8 September 1930) was a Swedish sprint canoeist who competed in the mid-1950s. He won a silver medal in the K-4 10000 m event at the 1954 ICF Canoe Sprint World Championships in Mâcon.

Sundin also finished fourth in the K-2 10000 m event at the 1956 Summer Olympics in Melbourne.

References

Sports-reference.com profile

1930 births
Canoeists at the 1956 Summer Olympics
Living people
Olympic canoeists of Sweden
Swedish male canoeists
ICF Canoe Sprint World Championships medalists in kayak